Carol Ammons is a Democratic member of the Illinois House of Representatives who has represented the 103rd district since January 2015. The 103rd district includes all or parts of Champaign, Urbana, and Staley. She is the first African American woman to serve in the seat, and the first from Champaign County to be elected beyond the County Board level. Ammons is a co-chair of the Illinois House's Progressive Caucus.

Early career
Ammons worked as a community organizer in the Urbana-Champaign, Illinois community. She served five years on the Champaign County Board and later the Urbana City Council. Following her election to the Illinois House of Representatives, the Urbana City Council appointed her recently pardoned husband Aaron Ammons to fill her vacated seat.

Electoral career
Ammons' victory in the Illinois 2014 Primary Election for the Illinois House of Representatives' 103rd District was widely considered an upset. Her opponent, Sam Rosenberg, received the endorsement of retiring State Representative Naomi Jakobsson and the financial support of Illinois House Speaker Michael Madigan, whose political committees donated $60,422 to the Rosenberg campaign. Ammons' itemized campaign contributions amounted to $16,000 compared to Rosenberg's $185,000.

In April 2015, Ammons formally announced that she was considering a run for Congress in Illinois' 13th Congressional District, but ultimately decided not to.

Ammons, while unopposed for reelection, was one of eight candidates endorsed by Bernie Sanders during his 2016 presidential campaign.

Illinois House of Representatives

The 103rd district primarily encompasses the Champaign-Urbana community, including the University of Illinois Urbana-Champaign campus. Ammons is also an active member of the Illinois Legislative Black Caucus and in early 2023 was named Joint Chair of the caucus.

Committees
As of 2022, Ammons serves on the following committees and subcommittees:
Appropriations - Higher Education Committee
Counties & Townships Committee
Economic Opportunity & Equity Committee
Energy & Environment Committee
Ethics & Elections Committee
Higher Education Committee
Small Business, Tech Innovation, and Entrepreneurship Committee(Chairperson)
Campaign Finance Subcommittee

Legislation
Bills of which Ammons is listed as the Primary Sponsor and which have gone on to become law in Illinois include HB3783, which amends the Illinois Environmental Protection Act to require the Illinois Environmental Protection Agency to certify that all workers who install coal combustion residual surface impoundments have completed specified trainings preparing them to do so, and HB1063, which repealed a statute that had created the criminal offense of transmitting HIV.

Controversy
During Ammons' 2014 campaign for the Illinois House of Representatives, Carol Ammons claimed to have graduated from Walsingham University in London, UK. Critics and local media pointed out that Walsingham is considered to be a pay-for-play, "diploma mill" and is not included on any credentialed lists of British government institutions of higher learning. Critics called on Ammons to drop out of the race due to the claim and related controversy. 

In 2015, upon Carol Ammons' election to the Illinois House of Representatives and prior to her taking office, it was announced that Ammons' husband, Aaron Ammons, was pardoned by the outgoing governor of Illinois for violent and non-violent crimes relating to heroin possession and other charges. When local media examined the pardon, they questioned the lack of due diliginece and whether favoritism had been shown and proper procedures had been followed. The pardon allowed Carol Ammons' husband to apply for and be granted Carol Ammons' seat on the Urbana City Council, which she was vacating for her State Rep seat. 

In 2020, Carol Ammons was investigated for the theft of a Coach purse from a non-profit resale shop that raises funds for sick children. 

In 2020, Carol Ammons claimed to be Chairwoman of the Democratic Party for Champaign County, part of a months long controversy. 

In early 2023, Ammons applied for the Illinois Senate seat for the 52nd District that had been vacated by the untimely death of Senator Scott Bennett. Paul Faraci was eventually named to the seat. In the lead up to the appointment, Carol Ammons supporters and husband Aaron Ammons were very vocal in their criticisms of the process and in others being considered for the seat. Several members of the Champaign County Democrats and the family of the late Scott Bennett ultimately made public statements refuting Carol and Aaron Ammons’ statements to the media and sharing disappointment in the Ammons’ actions around the time of Bennett’s death and during the posthumous appointment of a replacement to Bennett’s seat. Carol Ammons appeared as a guest on Aaron Ammons’ WEFT radio show a month after the appointment to call the process a “public lynching” and stated that she had “selflessly sought the Bennett seat,” regardless.

Personal life
Ammons currently resides in Urbana with her husband, Aaron Ammons. Aaron Ammons is currently serving as the County Clerk for Champaign County, Illinois. Carol and Aarons' daughter, Titianna, served on the Champaign County Board until her resignation in 2021. Titianna Ammons reportedly received death threats during her campaign for County Board.

In the 2016 United States presidential election, Ammons served as a presidential elector from Illinois.

Electoral history

References

External links
Representative Carol Ammons (D) 103rd District at the Illinois General Assembly

Carol Ammons constituency site
Profile at Project VoteSmart
Representative Carol Ammons at Illinois House Democrats

Living people
Democratic Party members of the Illinois House of Representatives
Year of birth missing (living people)
People from Urbana, Illinois
African-American state legislators in Illinois
African-American women in politics
Women state legislators in Illinois
Illinois city council members
Women city councillors in Illinois
21st-century American politicians
21st-century American women politicians
County board members in Illinois
2016 United States presidential electors
21st-century African-American women
21st-century African-American politicians